Victoria Pedretti (born March 23, 1995) is an American actress. Her accolades include an MTV Award and nominations for two Critics' Choice Awards and a Saturn Award.

Pedretti rose to prominence for her work in the Netflix anthology series The Haunting, playing the supporting role of Eleanor "Nell" Crain in Hill House (2018) and the leading role of Danielle "Dani" Clayton in Bly Manor (2020), and for starring as Love Quinn in the Netflix thriller series You (2019–2023). She starred as Leslie Van Houten in the comedy-drama film Once Upon a Time in Hollywood (2019) and Katherine in the biographical-drama film Shirley (2020).

Early life 
Pedretti was born in Philadelphia on March 23, 1995. Three of her father's four grandparents were Italian, while her maternal grandmother was Ashkenazi Jewish. Pedretti had a bat mitzvah. She has said that she grew up in an emotionally abusive household, but said of her parents that she "love[s] them very much and they tried their best". She was diagnosed with ADHD when she was six years old.

Pedretti attended Pennsbury High School in Fairless Hills, where she expressed an interest in musical theatre, and the Carnegie Mellon School of Drama in Pittsburgh, where she earned a BFA in acting in 2017.

Career 
Pedretti rose to prominence for her role on Netflix's 2018 series The Haunting of Hill House, where she played Eleanor "Nell" Crain Vance. She was lauded for her performance, and earned Saturn Award and MTV Award nominations in 2019; she was promptly established as a modern-day scream queen. Dakota Moss of MovieWeb wrote that "Pedretti's emotions to the role add a horrifying realism to the character, and viewers can feel all of Nell's pain and anguish to the very end. This is one of the defining roles for Victoria Pedretti, and she's only getting started."

Pedretti auditioned for the role of Guinevere Beck on the thriller series You; although she was rejected, the directors later cast her as Love Quinn in the show's second season after seeing her previous acting work and her chemistry with her co-star Penn Badgley. The second season was released by Netflix on December 26, 2019, with Pedretti's performance and the show being received positively. Also in 2019, Pedretti appeared as Leslie Van Houten in Quentin Tarantino's comedy-drama film Once Upon a Time in Hollywood, which was a commercial success, and earned her a nomination for the Critics' Choice Movie Award for Best Acting Ensemble. 

In 2020, Pedretti guest-starred in the anthology series Amazing Stories as Evelyn Porter, and in the same year starred as Katherine in the biographical-drama film Shirley, the latter of which received positive reviews from critics. She was next announced to lead the follow-up season to Hill House, later revealed to be titled The Haunting of Bly Manor, which was released in 2020 to positive reception. Screen Rant wrote that "if there is any performance that has absolutely been a star-making one, one would need look no further than Victoria Pedretti's incredible work..." For her performance, she earned a nomination from the Critics' Choice Super Awards and won the award for Best Frightened Performance at the 2021 MTV Movie & TV Awards. She stated that the role of Dani helped her to grow comfortable towards playing darker roles in the horror and thriller genres, later stating that she has "got a knack for" them.

In 2021, Pedretti appeared in singer-songwriter Kacey Musgraves' film Star-Crossed, a companion feature to Musgraves' album of the same name, in a cameo role as a woman participating in a heist. A clip from the film featuring Pedretti served as the music video for Musgraves' song "Simple Times". She reprised the role of Love Quinn for the third season of You, which was released on October 15, 2021. Filming was done amidst the COVID-19 pandemic, where the intimate scenes posed a challenge Pedretti to film: "This is not a show where you can be like, 'Nobody's going to kiss. It'll be fine.' So it took months to figure out how to do it safely. [...] It's weird. We have a rapport. We played a couple before, but it didn't just immediately come back after being in a global pandemic." She was nominated for Best Villain at the 2022 MTV Movie & TV Awards.

Pedretti was announced in May 2021 to star in the film Lucky, based on the memoir of the same name, in which she would be portraying writer Alice Sebold during her freshman year at Syracuse University, however in November that same year, the film was cancelled after losing its financing. Pedretti was announced the next year to be headlining the Hulu original series Saint X, but she reportedly left the series due to creative differences, with Alycia Debnam-Carey replacing her in the lead role. She is set to star in the upcoming drama film Caste.

Filmography

Film

Television

Awards and nominations

References

External links 
 
 

1995 births
21st-century American actresses
Actresses from Pennsylvania
American film actresses
American people of Italian descent
American television actresses
Carnegie Mellon University College of Fine Arts alumni
Jewish American actresses
Living people
Pennsbury High School alumni